The 1997 Thai Premier League consisted of 12 teams. The bottom club would be relegated to the Thailand Division 1 League. The club that came 11th would play in a relegation / promotion match against the club that came second in the Thailand Division 1 League

Defending Champions Bangkok Bank would enter the next edition of the Asian Club Championship.

The league was also known as the Johnnie Walker Thailand Soccer League 1997.

Member clubs locations

Bangkok Bank
Bangkok Metro Administration (rename from Stock Exchange of Thailand FC)
Tero Sasana (Singha Tero Sasana)
Sinthana
Royal Thai Police
Port Authority of Thailand
UCOM Raj Pracha
Royal Thai Air Force
Royal Thai Army
Royal Thai Navy
Thai Farmers Bank
TOT

Final league table

Promotion/relegation playoff 

The club that came 11th would play in a relegation / promotion match against the runner-up in the Thailand Division 1 League

February 17 and February 20, 1998

† Royal Thai Police relegated to the Thailand Division 1 League and Osotsapa promoted to the Thai Premier League in next season.

Season Notes
 Royal Thai Air Force were docked three points at the end of season for refusing to play Sinthana in Suphan Buri earlier this season.
 Singha Tero Sasana changed the club's name to Tero Sasana.
 Tero Sasana represented Thailand in the 1998–99 Asian Club Championship following withdrawals by Royal Thai Air Force, Bangkok Bank and Port Authority of Thailand, all for economic reasons; Sinthana qualifier for the 1998–99 Asian Cup Winners Cup after winning the Singha FA Cup.
 Last year's runners-up, Stock Exchange of Thailand, played as Bangkok Metropolitan Administration (BMA) owing to a change in sponsorship.

Queen's Cup

Thai Farmers Bank won and retained the Queen's Cup trophy for the 4th year running.  This was the 26th edition of the competition.

For the first time, no foreign teams took part, owing to the poor economic situation.

Thawan Thammaniyai of Thai Farmers Bank won the Most Valuable Player award.

Thailand FA Cup

Sinthana FC won the Thailand FA Cup for the first time, but it is unclear whom they beat in the final.

Asian Representation

 Bangkok Bank represented Thailand in the 1997–98 Asian Club Championship, where they would fail in the first round, beaten by Chinese opposition in Dalian Wanda.
 Royal Thai Air Force made the second round of the 1997–98 Asian Cup Winners Cup, where they were beaten by near neighbours PSM Ujungpandang of Indonesia after beating Melaka Telekom of Malaysia in the first round.

Annual awards

Coach of the Year 
 Piyapong Piew-on - Royal Thai Air Force

Player of the Year 
 Seksan Piturat - Sinthana

Top scorer 
 Worrawoot Srimaka - 17 Goals BEC Tero Sasana

Champions
The league champion was Royal Thai Air Force. It was the team's first title.

References

Thailand 1997 RSSSF

External links
Official Website

Thai League 1 seasons
Thailand
Thailand
1